The Lompobattang flycatcher (Ficedula bonthaina), also spelt Lompobatang flycatcher, is a species of bird in the family Muscicapidae. It is endemic to the Indonesia island of Sulawesi. Its natural habitat is subtropical or tropical moist montane forests. It is threatened by habitat loss.

References

Lompobattang flycatcher
Endemic birds of Sulawesi
Lompobattang flycatcher
Taxonomy articles created by Polbot